Gábor Ugron de Ábránfalva the Younger (8 January 1880 – 27 October 1960) was a Hungarian politician, a member of one of the oldest noble families of Transylvania, who served as Interior Minister between 1917 and 1918. After the First World War he organized the Szekler National Council. His father was the parliamentary representative Gábor Ugron.

References
 Magyar Életrajzi Lexikon

1880 births
1960 deaths
People from Târgu Mureș
Hungarian Interior Ministers
Lord-lieutenants of a county in Hungarian Kingdom